Rochester was a parliamentary constituency in Kent. It returned two members of parliament (MPs) to the House of Commons of England from 1295 to 1707, then to the House of Commons of Great Britain from 1708 to 1800, and finally to the House of Commons of the Parliament of the United Kingdom from 1801 until the 1885 general election, when its representation was reduced to one seat.

In 1918, it was split between Chatham and Gillingham. The Chatham seat became Rochester and Chatham in 1950, and then Medway in 1983.  When the boroughs of Rochester upon Medway and Gillingham merged to form the larger unitary Borough of Medway in 1998, the Parliamentary constituency of Medway only covered part of the new borough, so for the 2010 election it was renamed Rochester and Strood.

Members of Parliament

MPs 1295–1640

MPs 1640–1885

MPs 1885–1918

Elections

Elections in the 1830s

Elections in the 1840s

Elections in the 1850s

  
 

 

Villiers resigned, causing a by-election.

Elections in the 1860s

Elections in the 1870s
Kinglake's death caused a by-election.

 

 

 

Martin's death caused a by-election.

Elections in the 1880s

 

Hughes-Hallett resigned, causing a by-election.

Elections in the 1890s

Davies was unseated on petition, causing a by-election.

Elections in the 1900s

Elections in the 1910s

General Election 1914–15:

Another General Election was required to take place before the end of 1915. The political parties had been making preparations for an election to take place and by July 1914, the following candidates had been selected; 
Liberal: Ernest Lamb
Unionist:

References

Robert Beatson, "A Chronological Register of Both Houses of Parliament" (London: Longman, Hurst, Res & Orme, 1807) 
D Brunton & D H Pennington, Members of the Long Parliament (London: George Allen & Unwin, 1954)
Cobbett's Parliamentary history of England, from the Norman Conquest in 1066 to the year 1803 (London: Thomas Hansard, 1808) 
 Maija Jansson (ed.), Proceedings in Parliament, 1614 (House of Commons) (Philadelphia: American Philosophical Society, 1988)
 J E Neale, The Elizabethan House of Commons (London: Jonathan Cape, 1949)

Parliamentary constituencies in Kent (historic)
Politics of Medway
Constituencies of the Parliament of the United Kingdom disestablished in 1918
Constituencies of the Parliament of the United Kingdom established in 1295